Leonard "Len" Eyre (27 November 1925 – November 1986) was an English middle- and long-distance runner who won gold and silver medals at the British Empire Games.

He was born in Sheffield and was a member of the Harehills Harriers athletics club, Leeds. At the 1950 British Empire Games in Auckland he won the gold medal in the 3 miles/5000 metres event, having not regularly competed at that distance and he finished second to Bill Parnell of Canada in the 1 mile event. He competed in the 1500 metres at the 1952 Summer Olympic Games in Helsinki, but was eliminated in the heats. He then moved to longer distances. He last competed internationally in 1953 in a Great Britain v Sweden match in which he was 3rd in the 5000 metres. He died aged 60 in 1986.

References

1925 births
1986 deaths
Sportspeople from Sheffield
English male long-distance runners
English male middle-distance runners
Olympic athletes of Great Britain
Athletes (track and field) at the 1952 Summer Olympics
Commonwealth Games gold medallists for England
Commonwealth Games medallists in athletics
Athletes (track and field) at the 1950 British Empire Games
Medallists at the 1950 British Empire Games